Massachusetts, with forests covering  (59%) of its land area, administers more than  of state forest, wildlife and watershed land under the cabinet level Executive Office of Energy and Environmental Affairs. Lands are managed by Department of Conservation and Recreation, Division of State Parks and Recreation, Division of Fisheries and Wildlife (MassWildlife), and the Division of Water Supply Protection's Office of Watershed Management.

Current state forests

See also

 List of U.S. National Forests
 List of Massachusetts State Parks

References

External links
 State Executive Office of Energy and Environmental Affairs
 Massachusetts Department of Conservation and Recreation's Massachusetts State Parks
 DCR Forestry home page
 DCR - Forest Management Planning
 Eight districts of Forest Management

Massachusetts
Forests